The following radio stations broadcast on AM frequency 1010 kHz: 1010 AM is a Canadian clear-channel frequency.  CFRB Toronto and CBR Calgary are both Class A, 50,000 watt stations.

In Argentina 
 LV16 Rio Cuarto in Rio Cuarto, Córdoba
 Onda Latina in Buenos Aires

In Canada 
Stations in bold are clear-channel stations.

In Cuba 
 Radio Mil Diez, defunct

In Mexico 
  in Huejutla de Reyes, Hidalgo
  in San Juan de Ocotán, Jalisco
 XEPA-AM in Puebla, Puebla
  in Ures, Sonora

In the United States

In Uruguay 
 CX 24 Nuevo Tiempo in Montevideo

References

Lists of radio stations by frequency